Girolamo Nattino (1842–1913) was an Italian painter, who depicted eclectic subjects, including genre, landscapes, and portraits.

Biography
He studied ornamentation and design from the Academy of Fine Arts of Naples, under Giuseppe Mancinelli. He was a resident of Naples. In 1870 at Parma, he exhibited: Due montoni che pascolano, oil canvas and Frutta. In 1887 at Naples, he exhibited Rimembranze and Lucrezia Romana. In 1881 at Milan, he exhibited: Una filatrice and Venditore di mele (both genre pieces); Frutta and a Mezza (still-life); and a portrait of a woman. In 1883 to Milan and Rome, he sent: Presso il Grunatello a Portici; Frutta e Fiori; Frutta e Avanzi Angioini a Monteleone di Calabria. Alla General Italian Exposition of Fine Arts of Turin in 1884, he displayed: Marina di Resina; Naples da Portici; Contadinello di San Germano, and Roseo di Portici; at Venice, in 1887, Naples dalla marina di Portici; La prima Comunione e Norina. Among his other works are: Un Contadinello: a Forosella; Venditore di frutta; Marina di sera, and Spiaggia tirrena.

References

1842 births
1913 deaths
Painters from Naples
19th-century Italian painters
Italian male painters
20th-century Italian painters
Italian landscape painters
19th-century Italian male artists
20th-century Italian male artists